Lily Chakraborty, (born 15 January 1972) is an Indian Ghazal singer, Bengali poet and composer. Her works include the short story  Galpo Gucco (2009) and the poetry anthologies Akakitto (2009) and Chandey Kabo (2010).  Chakraborty's 2009 album, Janele-Aye-Dil, is the first digitally recorded release in India.

Discography
 Janele-Aye-Dil 2009
 Live in Concert 2010
 Tribute to Jagjit Singh 2012
 Hulchul 2013

Books
 Akakitto 2009
 Bhabna 2011
 Galpo Gucco 2009
 Prem 2010
 Chandey Kabo 2010
 Gucco Kabita 2011

References

External links
 Official website

1972 births
Indian women composers
21st-century Indian composers
Indian women ghazal singers
Indian ghazal singers
Musicians from Kolkata
Bengali musicians
Living people
Indian women poets
Bengali female poets
Poets from West Bengal
21st-century Indian women singers
21st-century Indian singers
Singers from West Bengal
Women musicians from West Bengal
21st-century women composers